Albury Wodonga Bandits is a NBL1 East club based in Albury, New South Wales. The club fields a team in both the Men's and Women's NBL1 East. The club is a division of the overarching Border Basketball Club, the major administrative basketball organisation in the Albury–Wodonga region. The Bandits play their home games at the Lauren Jackson Sports Centre. For sponsorship reasons, the two teams are known as the Southern Vale Homes Bandits.

Club history

Men's team
In 1984, a team known as the Wodonga Border Bulldogs entered the South Eastern Basketball League (SEBL). Based out of the Victorian city of Wodonga, the Bulldogs' home venue was the Wodonga Sports and Leisure Centre. The Wodonga stadium was the original home court in 1984 before the venue split games with the newly constructed Albury Sports Stadium the following year. The Bulldogs' final game they hosted at the Wodonga Sports and Leisure Centre was on 25 August 1985 before changing their name to the Albury Wodonga Bandits in 1986 and re-locating to nearby Albury.

Not a lot of success came for the Bandits over their first 17 seasons in the SEBL/SEABL/CBA/ABA. That changed in 2001 when coach Leigh Gooding and players Allen McCowan, Matt Sheehan, Russell Hinder, Nick Grylewicz and Nick Payne helped lead the Bandits to championship success in the ABA's East Conference.

The Bandits next tasted success in 2012 when they not only won the SEABL's South Conference title, but took home the SEABL National Championship after defeating the East Conference champion Dandenong Rangers in the grand final.

In 2015, the Bandits returned to the SEABL Grand Final after winning the East Conference Championship, but couldn't claim National Championship honours after losing to the Mount Gambier Pioneers.

Women's team
In 2006, an Albury Wodonga Bandits women's team entered the SEABL. After missing the playoffs in each of their first three seasons, the Lady Bandits qualified for the post-season for the first time in 2009 behind coach Kennedy Kereama and star import duo Lisa Wallbutton and Toni Edmondson. Heading into the 2014 season, the Lady Bandits had a 39–153 win–loss record.

In 2019, following the demise of the SEABL, the Bandits joined the NBL1 South. For the 2022 season, the Bandits joined the NBL1 East.

References

External links
Official website

South East Australian Basketball League teams
Sport in Albury, New South Wales
1984 establishments in Australia
Basketball teams established in 1984
Basketball teams in New South Wales